A newsletter is a small publication reporting the activities of a business or an organization. It can also refer to a traditional newspaper. It may also refer to:

The News Letter, a Northern Irish newspaper
The Johns Hopkins News-Letter, a student newspaper of the Johns Hopkins University

See also
 
 

Professional and trade magazines
Newspapers